{{Infobox football club season
|club               = Spartak Moscow
|season             = 2021–22
|image              = 
|image_size         = 
|alt                = 
|caption            = 
|ownertitle         = 
|owner              = 
|chrtitle           = Managing director
|chairman           = Yevgeni Melezhikov
|mgrtitle           = Head coach
|manager            = Rui Vitória(until 15 December 2021)  Paolo Vanoli(from 17 December 2021)
|stdtitle           = 
|stadium            = Otkritie Arena
|league             = 
|league result      = 
|cup1               = 
|cup1 result        = 
|cup2               = 
|cup2 result        = 
|cup3               = 
|cup3 result        = 
|league topscorer   = Aleksandr Sobolev (9)
|season topscorer   = Aleksandr Sobolev (14)
|highest attendance = 
|lowest attendance  = 
|average attendance =  
| pattern_la1 = _spartak2122h
| pattern_b1 = _spartak2122h
| pattern_ra1 = _spartak2122h
| pattern_sh1 = _spartak2122h
| pattern_so1 = 
| leftarm1 = FF0000
| body1 = FF0000
| rightarm1 = FF0000
| shorts1 = FFFFFF
| socks1 = FF0000
| pattern_la2 = _redborder
| pattern_b2 = _spartak2122a
| pattern_ra2 = _redborder
| pattern_sh2 = _spartak2122a
| pattern_so2 = _spartak2021H
| leftarm2 = FFFFFF
| body2 = FFFFFF
| rightarm2 = FFFFFF
| shorts2 = FF0000
| socks2 = FFFFFF
|prevseason         = 2020–21
|nextseason         = 2022–23
}}
The 2021–22 season was the 100th season in the existence of FC Spartak Moscow and the club's 30th consecutive season in the top flight of Russian football. In addition to the domestic league, Spartak Moscow participate in this season's editions of the Russian Cup and the UEFA Champions League.

Squad

Contract suspensions

Out on loan

Transfers

In

Loans in

Out

Loans out

Contract suspensions

Released

Pre-season and friendlies

Competitions
Overall record

Premier League

League table

Results summary

Results by round

Matches

Russian Cup

Final

UEFA Champions League

Third qualifying round
The draw for the third qualifying round was held on 19 July 2021.

UEFA Europa League

Group stage

The draw for the group stage was held on 27 August 2021.

Knockout stage

The draw for the round of 16 was held on 25 February 2022. RB Leipzig won on walkover after Spartak Moscow were disqualified as a result of UEFA's suspension of Russian clubs from all competitions following the Russian invasion of Ukraine.

Squad statistics

Appearances and goals

|-
|colspan="14"|Players who suspended their contracts:|-
|colspan="14"|Players away from the club on loan:|-
|colspan="14"|Players who left Spartak Moscow during the season:''

|}

Goal scorers

Clean sheets

Disciplinary record

References

FC Spartak Moscow seasons
Spartak Moscow